Diarchy (from Greek , di-, "double", and , -arkhía, "ruled"), duarchy, or duumvirate (from Latin , "the office of the two men") is a form of government characterized by corule, with two people ruling a polity together either lawfully or de facto, by collusion and force. The leaders of such a system are usually known as corulers.

Historically, diarchy particularly referred to the system of shared rule in British India established by the Government of India Acts 1919 and 1935, which devolved some powers to local councils, which had included native Indian representation under the Indian Councils Act 1892. 'Duumvirate' principally referred to the offices of the various duumviri established by the Roman Republic. Both, along with less common synonyms such as biarchy and tandemocracy, are now used more generally to refer to any system of joint rule or office. A monarchy temporarily controlled by two or more people is, however, usually distinguished as a coregency.

Corule is one of the oldest forms of government. Historical examples include the Pandyan dynasty of Tamilakam, Sparta's joint kingship, the Roman Republic's consuls, Carthage's Judges, and several ancient Polynesian societies. Systems of inheritance that often led to corule in Germanic and Dacian monarchies may be included as well, as may the dual occupants of the ranks of the Inca Empire. Modern examples of diarchies are Andorra, whose princes are the President of France and the Bishop of Urgell in Catalonia; and San Marino, whose republic is led by two Captains Regent.

Formal use

Current diarchies

Andorra 

Andorra is a parliamentary co-principality. Its princes are (ex officio) the French president and the bishop of Urgell in Catalonia, Spain. Since 1962, the French president has been elected by universal suffrage within France. The bishop of the diocese of Urgell is appointed by the Roman Catholic pope.

Bhutan 

The 2008 Constitution affirms Bhutan's commitment to a traditional dual government sharing power between the Druk Gyalpo ("King") and the Buddhist religious authorities led by the Je Khenpo. In practice, however, the religious leaders function more as advisors to the kings than as corulers.

Northern Ireland
Under the terms of the 1998 Good Friday Agreement intended to end conflict in Northern Ireland, the First Minister and deputy First Minister serve as joint heads of the area's executive. Both positions exercise identical executive powers; however they are not heads of state.

San Marino 

The captains regent of San Marino are elected every six months by the Sammarinese parliament, the Grand and General Council.  They serve as heads of state and government and are normally chosen from opposing parties.

Israel 
After the 2019-2021 political crisis, the Basic Law of Israel's government underwent a major change. 
A system of two prime ministers, that can be appointed at the same time by the Knesset, was established. 

According to the new method, there is an “alternate prime minister” in addition to the main and declared one. After half of the government's term, the two prime ministers  change positions and status.

However, during the term, the government's roles and duties are divided between the two prime ministers and each one of them is entitled to remove ministers without the other's interference.

Historical diarchies

Sparta

The office of king in ancient Sparta was divided between two kings from separate dynasties, each holding a veto over the other's actions. However, the Spartan kings' powers and duties consisted mainly of leading the Spartan army on campaign (during which only one king would usually lead a given force) and certain religious functions, as well as having ex-officio seats in the Gerousia (Senate).  Actual day-to-day public administration in Sparta was managed by the ephors.

Roman Republic

Following the overthrow of the Roman monarchy, the Romans established an oligarchic Roman Republic which divided supreme executive power between two consuls, both elected each year and each holding a veto over the other's actions.

The historical duumviri were not rulers but magistrates, performing various judicial, religious, or public functions.

Hungary
The Hungarians originally possessed a system of dual kingship, with religious authority vested in the kende and military authority vested in the war-chief. It is believed that when the kende Kurszán was killed  a little after the arrival of the Hungarians in Pannonia, his role was usurped by the war-chief Árpád, establishing the Hungarian monarchy. It is not known with certainty whether Árpád was originally the kende or the gyula.

Medieval Europe

A paréage was a feudal treaty recognizing the "equal footing" of two sovereigns over a territory. The most famous such arrangement was the 1278 treaty that established modern Andorra. Others include Maastricht, which was shared by the Duke of Brabant and the Prince-Bishopric of Liège. After the establishment of the Dutch Republic, it became a condominium of Liège and the United Provinces, which administered it through the States General of the Netherlands until 1794.

Japan
During Japan's shogunate, the emperor was notionally a supreme spiritual and temporal lord who delegated authority for joint rule to the shōgun. In practice, the shōguns power was so complete that they are usually considered de facto monarchs rather than viceroys or corulers.

Tibet

Between 1642 and 1751, political power in Tibet was shared between the 5th, 6th, and 7th Dalai Lamas who headed the realm's Buddhist state religion and various secular rulers known as desis. The growing power of the desis caused the 7th Dalai Lama to abolish the post and replace it with a council known as the Kashag, permitting him to consolidate his authority over the realm. A similar system arose in Bhutan, with the Wangchuck governor (penlop) of Trongsa becoming the Druk Desi and Druk Gyalpo in 1907. In contrast to Tibet, the dynasty eventually consolidated its power and now rules as the kings of Bhutan.

Canada 

The colonial Province of Canada was usually governed by two joint premiers from 1841 to 1867. Usually, one was chosen from the English-speaking Canada West and the other one from the French-speaking Canada East.

Russia

From 1619-1633, Tsar Michael of Russia ruled along with his father, Patriarch Filaret of Moscow. Both were addressed as Velikiy Gosudar (Great Sovereign), held court together, and when they did not the ceremony was the same. While both were equal in theory, in practice Patriarch Filaret ruled, with Michael supporting whatever his father ordered.

Between the February Revolution in March 1917 and the October Revolution in November, political power in Russia was divided between the Russian Provisional Government and the Petrograd Soviet, a condition described by Vladimir Lenin as "Dual Power". He elaborated the situation into a dual-power doctrine, whereby Communists collaborated with and then supplanted existing bourgeois forms of government.

India
Named as the India Secretary for the Lloyd George ministry, Edwin Samuel Montagu made the "Grand Declaration" on 20 August 1917 that British policy would henceforth be "increasing association of Indians in every branch of the administration and the gradual development of self-governing institutions". Montagu and Viscount Chelmsford, the Governor-General of India, then made an extensive tour of the subcontinent in 1917 and 1918. The Montague–Chelmsford Report's recommendations formed the basis for the Government of India Act 1919 that established "diarchy" in British India. 

Under that act, the executive was to be headed by a governor appointed by the Secretary of State, who could consult the Governor General. The governor was responsible to the Secretary of State for acts of omission and commission. He was to maintain law and order in the province and ensure that the provincial administration worked smoothly. In respect of transferred subjects, he was to be assisted by his ministers whereas reserved subjects were to be administered by the Governor General and his executive council.

The members of the Executive Council were to be appointed by the Secretary of State and were responsible to him in all matters. There were certain matters that he was to administer at his own discretion, in which he was responsible to the Secretary of State. Each councillor was to remain in office for a period of four years. Their salaries and service conditions were not subject to the vote of provincial legislature. All decisions in the council were to be taken by a majority of votes, the Governor being able to break ties.

Samoa

During the establishment of the modern state of Samoa in 1962, power was shared between the two chiefs Malietoa Tanumafili II and Tupua Tamasese Meaʻole. Meaʻole died the next year, after which the country functioned as a monarchy until the death of Tanumafili and a republic thereafter.

Bolivia 

Following a coup d'état in 1964, former Vice President René Barrientos rose to power as president of the military junta. The following year, faced with discontent from loyalists of General Alfredo Ovando Candía, Barrientos promulgated the co-presidency between himself and Ovando Candía. The pair ruled as dual presidents until 1966 when Barrientos resigned in order to run in that year's general election.

Informal use

Bureaucracy
Shared power arrangements within a modern bureaucracy may also be known as a "diarchy" or "duumvirate". Examples include the joint authority of the Chief of the Defence Force and the Secretary of the Department of Defence over the Australian Defence Organisation.

Influential outsiders

The status of monarchs is sometimes impugned by accusations of corule when an advisor, family member, lover, or friend appears to have taken too great a hand in government. Lü Buwei in Chinese history and François Leclerc du Tremblay in France are famous examples of "éminences grises" who controlled much of their countries' policies. In British history, George VI's reign was mocked as a "split-level matriarchy in pants" owing to the supposed influence of his mother, Queen Mary and his wife Queen Elizabeth.

Informally shared power
Owing to Confucian notions of filial piety, Chinese and Japanese emperors were sometimes able to 'retire' but continue to exert great influence over state policy. In Indonesia, Sukarno and his vice president Mohammad Hatta were nicknamed the Duumvirate, with Sukarno setting government policy and rallying support and Hatta managing day-to-day administration. More recently, the great influence of Vladimir Putin over his successor Dmitry Medvedev was considered a duumvirate, or tandemocracy, until Putin's resumption of the office of president established him as the greater figure.

Within electoral politics, governments, coalitions and parties may sometimes have two fairly equal leaders, as with:

 The temporary First Whitlam Ministry of 5–19 December 1972, composed of Gough Whitlam  and Lance Barnard, which was nicknamed the "duumvirate".
 Russel Norman and Metiria Turei as joint leaders of the Green Party of Aotearoa New Zealand.

Religious leaders
In addition to actual sharing of political power between religious and military leaders, as occurred in Tibet and Bhutan, the great soft power of a religious leader such as the Pope of the Catholic Church over a devout country can sometimes be described as a form of diarchy or corule.

Traditional leaders
The Kingdom of Eswatini is a diarchy in which the King (Ngwenyama) rules in conjunction with his mother, the queen mother (Ndlovukati) in their capacity as traditional rulers. Constitutionally, however, the King is the sole head of state, though it is often argued that the giving of authority wholesale to the royal male in this way is a neo-traditionalistic as opposed to truly traditional custom.

In fiction 
 In The Gondoliers by Gilbert and Sullivan, the fictional land of Barataria is ruled jointly for a while by two kings, who happen to be the gondoliers themselves.
 Umbar, in the works of J. R. R. Tolkien, was ruled by a duumvirate. In its earliest years, Gondor was also ruled jointly by two kings, the two sons of Elendil. He himself was king of its sister realm Arnor, and served as high king over both realms.
  The Omaticaya, the Na'vi clan at the center of the film Avatar, are traditionally led by a pair of married tribal chiefs. One of them, the husband, oversees political and military matters while the other one, the wife, is in charge of spiritual and otherwise ceremonial affairs.
  The orbital colony New New York, in the Worlds trilogy by Joe Haldeman, is jointly governed by an elected Policy Coordinator and Engineering Coordinator.
 The Federated Commonwealths of America, in A Different Flesh by Harry Turtledove, is modelled heavily on the Roman Republic, governed by two chief executives styled as Censors (although the offices are more akin to the position of Consul). With each one being able to veto the actions of the other, the election of two politically-opposed Censors was intended as a check on executive power. Censors serve a single non-renewable five-year term and (alongside commonwealth governors) become life-long-serving members of the Senate upon leaving office.
 In Avenue 5, it is suggested that the Office of President of the United States became a duumvirate comprising a human and an artificial intelligence (reminiscent of a virtual assistant).

See also 
 Directorial system
 Monarchy, rule by a single person
 Coregency, temporary rule over a monarchy by two or more people
 Triumvirate, joint rule by three people
 Tetrarchy, joint rule by four people
 Decemviri, joint rule by ten people
 Condominium (international law)

Notes

References

Citations

Sources 

 .
 .
 .

Collective heads of state
 
Greek words and phrases